Logan County is a county in the U.S. state of North Dakota. As of the 2020 census, the population was 1,876. Its county seat is Napoleon.

History
The Dakota Territory legislature created the county on January 4, 1873. It was named for John A. Logan (1826-1886), a Civil War general and United States Senator from Illinois. The county government was not organized at that time, but the county was not attached to another county for administrative or judicial purposes. The county government organization was effected on September 1, 1884.

The county's boundaries were altered in 1883. They have remained in the present configuration since that time. Napoleon was the county seat from 1884 to 1899. King became the county seat briefly in 1899 before Napoleon once again was given that title.

Geography
The Logan County terrain consists of rolling hills, dotted with lakes and ponds. The area is largely devoted to agriculture. The terrain slopes to the east, with its highest point near its southwestern corner at 2,133' (650m) ASL.

Major highways

  North Dakota Highway 3
  North Dakota Highway 13
  North Dakota Highway 30
  North Dakota Highway 34
  North Dakota Highway 56

Adjacent counties

 Stutsman County - northeast
 LaMoure County - east
 McIntosh County - south
 Emmons County - west
 Kidder County - northwest

Protected areas

 Arnies Lake
 Beaver Lake
 Doyles Lake
 Fish Lake (part)
 Island Lake
 McKenna Lake
 Red Lake
 Round Lake

Protected areas
 Beaver Lake State Park

Demographics

2000 census
As of the 2000 census, there were 2,308 people, 963 households, and 659 families in the county. The population density was 2/sqmi (1/km2). There were 1,193 housing units at an average density of 1.20/sqmi (0.46/km2). The racial makeup of the county was 99.18% White, 0.09% Black or African American, 0.13% Native American, 0.17% Asian, 0.13% from other races, and 0.30% from two or more races.  0.69% of the population were Hispanic or Latino of any race. 75.0% were of German, 7.0% Norwegian and 5.6% American ancestry.

There were 963 households, out of which 25.80% had children under the age of 18 living with them, 63.10% were married couples living together, 3.10% had a female householder with no husband present, and 31.50% were non-families. 29.20% of all households were made up of individuals, and 16.00% had someone living alone who was 65 years of age or older. The average household size was 2.32 and the average family size was 2.88.

The county population contained 22.60% under the age of 18, 3.60% from 18 to 24, 21.80% from 25 to 44, 25.00% from 45 to 64, and 27.00% who were 65 years of age or older. The median age was 46 years. For every 100 females there were 98.30 males. For every 100 females age 18 and over, there were 95.60 males.

The median income for a household in the county was $27,986, and the median income for a family was $33,125. Males had a median income of $23,750 versus $18,269 for females. The per capita income for the county was $16,947.  About 12.60% of families and 15.10% of the population were below the poverty line, including 16.20% of those under age 18 and 18.80% of those age 65 or over.

2010 census
As of the 2010 census, there were 1,990 people, 843 households, and 562 families in the county. The racial makeup of the county was 98.4% white, 0.5% American Indian, 0.3% Asian, 0.1% black or African American, 0.1% from other races, and 0.7% from two or more races. Those of Hispanic or Latino origin made up 0.6% of the population. In terms of ancestry, 76.0% were German, 16.2% were Russian, 9.9% were Norwegian, and 6.3% were American. The county has the highest share of Russian-Americans out of any county in the United States. 

Of the 843 households, 21.8% had children under the age of 18 living with them, 61.4% were married couples living together, 3.0% had a female householder with no husband present, 33.3% were non-families, and 30.8% of all households were made up of individuals. The average household size was 2.28 and the average family size was 2.84. The median age was 49.8 years.

The median income for a household in the county was $41,741 and the median income for a family was $52,262. Males had a median income of $34,451 versus $22,284 for females. The per capita income for the county was $21,654. About 8.3% of families and 10.9% of the population were below the poverty line, including 7.5% of those under age 18 and 18.9% of those age 65 or over.

Communities

Cities

 Fredonia
 Gackle
 Lehr (partly in McIntosh County)
 Napoleon (county seat)

Unincorporated communities
 Burnstad
 Guyson

Townships

 Finn
 Glendale
 Gutschmidt
 Haag
 Janke
 Red Lake
 Sealy

Unorganized territories
 East Logan
 West Logan

Defunct townships

 Bryant (now in West Logan UT)
 Dixon (now in West Logan UT)
 Kroeber
 Starkey (now in West Logan UT)

Politics
Logan County voters have traditionally voted Republican. In no national election since 1936 has the county selected the Democratic Party candidate.

See also
 National Register of Historic Places listings in Logan County, North Dakota

References

External links
 Logan County map, North Dakota DOT

 
1884 establishments in Dakota Territory
Populated places established in 1884